Torry Burn may refer to:

Torry Burn, Huntly, Aberdeenshire, Scotland
Torry Burn, burn in Cairneyhill, Fife, Scotland
Torryburn, village and parish in Fife, Scotland
Torryburn, New South Wales, Australia

See also
 Torry Burn (disambiguation)